Susanne Munk Wilbek [born Munk Lauritsen, ] is a former Danish team handball player and Olympic champion. She won a gold medal with the Danish national team at the 1996 Summer Olympics in Atlanta.

Susanne Lauritsen is married to handball coach Ulrik Wilbek.

References

1967 births
Living people
Danish female handball players
Olympic gold medalists for Denmark
Handball players at the 1996 Summer Olympics
Viborg HK players
Olympic medalists in handball
Medalists at the 1996 Summer Olympics